511 is the natural number following 510 and preceding 512.

It is a Mersenne number, being one less than a power of 2: .
As a result, 511 is a palindromic number and a repdigit in bases 2 (1111111112). It is also palindromic and a repdigit in base 8 (7778).

It is a generalized heptagonal number , since 
 when .

It is a Harshad number in bases 3, 5, 7, 10, 13 and 15.

Special use in computers 
The octal representation of 511 (7778) is commonly used by Unix commands to specify a custom record separator in order to "slurp" input as a whole, rather than line-by-line (i.e. separated at newline characters).

References

Integers